Alloway is a heritage-listed cottage located at 15 Gwydir Street, Moree, in the Moree Plains Shire local government area of New South Wales, Australia. It was built during 1875. The cottage was added to the New South Wales State Heritage Register on 2 April, 1999.

Description 

The house appears to date from the 1870s. The doorbell is dated 1876 while the cast iron lace work is dated 1880. It is sited on land granted to James Traynor in 1860. Alexander McIntosh bought the house in 1882 and the late F. J. Crowe purchased it from the MacIntosh Estate in 1951. The house is built of large weatherboards and has a steeply pitched gabled roof. A smaller gable breaks the line of the front verandah roof. The verandah is decorated with cast iron lace valances and brackets and has wooden posts and a brick floor. The eastern side has been enclosed with gauze. French doors with wooden shutters, brass door knobs and curved glass open onto the front verandah. A kitchen wing adjoins the main house and adjoining this is a flat which was originally the harness room. Interior has weatherboard walls and ceilings, cedar door and architraves. The pleasant garden is well-maintained and has numerous mature trees. The front fence is probably original and is of intertwined wire and timber posts. Curtilage to include area to property boundary.

Heritage listing 

As at 21 December, 2001, an attractive, well-preserved cottage-style house which is one of the oldest in Moree and is a rare example of this type of architecture in the area. It is enhanced by its setting in pleasant gardens with many mature trees.

Alloway was listed on the New South Wales State Heritage Register on 2 April 1999.

See also 

Australian residential architectural styles

References

Attribution 

New South Wales State Heritage Register
Moree Plains Shire
Houses in New South Wales
Articles incorporating text from the New South Wales State Heritage Register
1875 establishments in Australia
Houses completed in 1875